Saka is a village in Toila Parish, Ida-Viru County in northeastern Estonia.

Before the 2017 Administrative Reform, the village belonged to Kohtla Parish.

Saka Manor
In 1626, Saka was given as an estate by the Swedish king Gustavus Adolphus to the alderman of Narva Jürgen Leslie of Aberdeen, whose origins were Scottish but who had probably entered Swedish service during the time of the Thirty Years' War. The estate later passed into Baltic German von Löwis of Menar family, and the current building was erected during the ownership of Oscar von Löwis of Menar, in 1862-1864. It was built in an accomplished Italian renaissance style, unusual for Estonian manor houses.

During the Soviet occupation of Estonia, the manor was used by Soviet military forces. During this time the manor and the park fell into disrepair. It was abandoned, looted and left in ruins after their departure, but has later been restored.

Saka Hoard
In 2015, Saka Hoard was discovered in Saka. It is a silver hoard dating from the 11th or early 12th century.

References

External links

Saka manor
Saka manor at Estonian Manors Portal

Villages in Ida-Viru County
Manor houses in Estonia
Kreis Wierland